Matthias Maucksch (born 11 June 1969) is a German former footballer who played as midfielder or defender and worked as a manager in different Teams of Germanys 4th and 3rd leagues.

Playing career
Maucksch came through the youth system at Dynamo Dresden, and made his debut in the DDR-Oberliga in 1987. He stayed with Dynamo after reunification, and played in the Bundesliga for four seasons, his 118 appearances the club record at this level. After Dynamo's double relegation in 1995, he joined 2. Bundesliga side VfL Wolfsburg, where he remained for two years, leaving after their promotion to the Bundesliga. After one year back in Saxony with VfB Leipzig, he returned to the Bundesliga with 1. FC Nürnberg, but only made five league appearances and left after a year. After a similarly unproductive season with Energie Cottbus, he moved into amateur football in Saxony, playing for FV Dresden 06 and VfL Pirna-Copitz.

International career
He earned one cap for the East Germany national team, in one of the team's last games, a 3–0 defeat against France in 1990.

Coaching career
After the end of his playing career, Maucksch went into coaching, taking over at Döbelner SC in early 2007. In October of the same year, he was appointed as manager of Dynamo Dresden's reserve team, replacing Jan Seifert, who had stepped up to the assistant manager's role. In his second season in charge, he led the team to victory in both the Landesliga Sachsen and the Sachsenpokal. Following this success, he was appointed as manager of Dynamo's first team in October 2009, after the sacking of Ruud Kaiser. Maucksch managed to steer the club clear of relegation, and in the following season within an outside chance of a playoff place, but was sacked in April 2011 after a run of five games without a win.

In the summer of 2018 he signed with Sportfreunde Lotte. He was sacked after just four games on 24 August 2018.

On 9 January 2019, Maucksch was appointed as the manager of BFC Dynamo on a contract until June 2020.

Just a Half year later, at the end of the saison 2018–19 dissolved the BFC Dynamo the contract with Matthias Maucksch to follow his request.

Honours

As player
DDR-Oberliga: 1988–89, 1989–90
FDGB-Pokal: 1989–90

As coach
Landesliga Sachsen: 2009
Sachsenpokal: 2009

References

External links
 
 

1969 births
Living people
German footballers
East German footballers
East Germany international footballers
Association football midfielders
Association football defenders
Dynamo Dresden players
Dynamo Dresden II players
VfL Wolfsburg players
1. FC Lokomotive Leipzig players
1. FC Nürnberg players
FC Energie Cottbus players
Bundesliga players
2. Bundesliga players
German football managers
Dynamo Dresden managers
Berliner FC Dynamo managers
Association football utility players
Dynamo Dresden non-playing staff
DDR-Oberliga players
3. Liga managers
Sportfreunde Lotte managers
Footballers from Dresden